William John English VC (6 October 1882 – 4 July 1941) was an Irish born recipient of the Victoria Cross, the highest and most prestigious award for gallantry in the face of the enemy that can be awarded to British and Commonwealth forces.

Details
English was educated at Harvey Grammar School in Folkestone, Kent from 1894 to 1898 and Campbell College, Belfast from 1898 to 1899. The following year he went to South Africa and in November joined the Scottish Horse, a yeomanry regiment raised for service in South Africa. He served in the ranks until he was commissioned in March 1901. He was 18 years old, and a lieutenant in the 2nd Scottish Horse during the Second Boer War when the following deed took place on 3 July 1901 at Vlakfontein, South Africa, for which he was awarded the VC:

Following the end of the war, he went to the United Kingdom and received the decoration in person from the Prince of Wales during a large coronation parade of colonial troops in London on 1 July 1902.

Later life
He was commissioned in the Royal Army Service Corps in 1906 from the 2nd Dragoon Guards. He later achieved the rank of lieutenant colonel. He saw action in three major wars (Second Boer War, World War I and World War II. He died of a cerebral haemorrhage, on board a ship near Egypt, on active service with the Royal Ulster Rifles in 1941.  He is buried in Maala Cemetery, Aden (now Yemen).

The medal
His medal group (including the VC) was bequeathed to his former school, Campbell College, Belfast.  His medals included the Queen's South Africa Medal and 5 Bars (Cape Colony, Orange Free State, Transvaal, South Africa 1901 and South Africa 1902), 1914 Star with Ribbon Bar (5 August to 22 November 1914), British War Medal, Victory Medal, 1939-45 Star, Africa Star, 1939-45 War Medal, King Edward VII Coronation Medal (with Military Ribbon), King George VI Coronation Medal.

The medal group has been lent by their owners, Campbell College, for a 10-year period, from 2010, to the Imperial War Museum, London as part of their Victoria Cross and George Cross Collection.

References

Listed in order of publication year 
The Register of the Victoria Cross (1981, 1988 and 1997)

Ireland's VCs (Dept of Economic Development, 1995)
Monuments to Courage (David Harvey, 1999)
Irish Winners of the Victoria Cross (Richard Doherty & David Truesdale, 2000)

External links
     William John English VC account

Second Boer War recipients of the Victoria Cross
Irish recipients of the Victoria Cross
1882 births
1941 deaths
Burials in Yemen
British Army personnel of World War II
Military personnel from County Cork
Irish officers in the British Army
People from County Cork
People educated at Campbell College
Royal Army Service Corps officers
British Army personnel of the Second Boer War
British Army personnel of World War I
Royal Ulster Rifles officers
Scottish Horse officers
2nd Dragoon Guards (Queen's Bays) soldiers
Recipients of the Order of Agricultural Merit